Rauta is a village in Purani Block in Madhepura district of Bihar State, India.

References

Villages in Madhepura district